Filipp Vadimovich Avdeyev (born November 10, 1991) is a Russian actor and director. A graduate of the Moscow Art Theatre School. Since 2012 he has been an actor at the Gogol Center Theater.

Biography
Filipp Avdeyev was born on November 10, 1991 in Moscow. In 2001 he became a part of the troupe of the musical Nord-Ost, then he played in the Children's Musical Theater of a young actor, Avdeyev children actors played in Yeralash. In 2003 he made his film debut. In 2012 he graduated from the workshop of Kirill Serebrennikov at the Moscow Art Theater School.

Selected filmography

References

External links 
 Filipp Avdeyev on kino-teatr.ru

1991 births
Living people
Male actors from Moscow
Russian male child actors
Russian male film actors
Russian male television actors
21st-century Russian male actors
Russian theatre directors